The Ross Group is a privately owned full-service global film entertainment, brand and celebrity marketing agency founded by Mary Hall Ross.

About 
The Ross Group is responsible for the placement of high-profile brands of watches, jewelry, clothing, purses, and alcohol in such movies as The Da Vinci Code, The Thomas Crown Affair, The Bourne Identity, Pretty Woman, and Legally Blonde. They have a full-service office in Los Angeles. 

Mary Hall Ross is well known for collaborating with clothing designer Nino Cerruti and the film Pretty Woman. Having both experience as a model for Cole bathing suits and Director of Public Relations for Neiman Marcus, she has contributed to the expansion of the Hollywood film and its dominance in the world market.

References

External links 
 Official Web site

Public relations companies of the United States